La Rochette is a commune in the Hautes-Alpes department in southeastern France. It is located about 10 km north east of Gap.

Population

See also
Communes of the Hautes-Alpes department

References

Communes of Hautes-Alpes